Hampden is a township municipality of about 200 people in Le Haut-Saint-François Regional County Municipality, in the Estrie region of Quebec, Canada.

Demographics 

References

External links
 

Township municipalities in Quebec
Incorporated places in Estrie
Le Haut-Saint-François Regional County Municipality